Metrolink crash may refer to:

 2005 Glendale train crash, the collision of Metrolink commuter train #100 and an abandoned sport utility vehicle
 2008 Chatsworth train collision, the collision of a Union Pacific freight train and a Metrolink commuter train
 2015 Oxnard train derailment, the collision of a Metrolink passenger train and a truck